Dhal Al Misfir is a cavern that is a natural landmark in the Rawdat Rasid area of Qatar. The cave contains fibrous gypsum crystals. Its depth is anywhere from 40 meters to at least 100 meters. The entrance is approximately 12 x 4.5 meters and its gypsum crystals derive from the Lower Dammam Formation and Rus Formation.

See also
Natural areas of Qatar

References

Landforms of Qatar
Caves of Qatar